Janse van Rensburg is a South African surname. Notable people sharing this surname include:

Brent Janse van Rensburg (born 1980), South African rugby union coach
Hector Janse van Rensburg (born 1993), British painter
Jacques Janse van Rensburg (born 1987), South African cyclist
JC Janse van Rensburg (born 1986), South African rugby union footballer
Jennifer Janse van Rensburg (born 1993), German ice dancer
Johannes Frederik Janse van Rensburg (1898–1966), South African lawyer
Jono Janse van Rensburg (born 1989), South African rugby union player
Jurinus Janse van Rensburg (born 1952), South African military commander
Lang Hans Janse van Rensburg (1779–1836), South African leader
Nico Janse van Rensburg (born 1994), South African rugby union player
Reinardt Janse van Rensburg (born 1989), South African road bicycle racer
Rohan Janse van Rensburg (born 1994), South African rugby union player
Rhyno Janse van Rensburg (born 1991), South African cricketer
Siener Janse van Rensburg (1864–1926), South African prophet
Willem Cornelis Janse van Rensburg (1818–1865), South African politician
William G. L. Janse van Rensburg  (1939–2008), mayor of Johannesburg
                              

Afrikaans-language surnames